Shi Hanqing (born 19 August 1990) is a Chinese pool player and former professional snooker player.

Snooker career
Shi first appeared at a ranking event at age of 19, playing Matthew Selt in the wildcard round of the 2009 Shanghai Masters in which he was whitewashed 0–5.

In the 2012–13 season he appeared in the three Asian events in that year's Players Tour Championship In APTC Event 1, he reached the last 64 where he was knocked out by Stephen Lee by a scoreline of 1–4, and reached the last 16 in events 2 and 3, being defeated by professionals Barry Hawkins and Ken Doherty to scorelines of 2-4 and 0-4 respectively.

He turned professional in time for the 2013–14 season by virtue of finishing 3rd in the APTC Order of Merit from the previous season. However, Shi did not enter any ranking tournaments other than the three Asian PTC events he entered the previous season; his best finishes were the last 64 in events 1 and 2 where he lost Liam Highfield and Jin Long; he also entered event 3 but withdrew from the event. He did not renew his WPBSA membership for the following season and dropped off the main tour.

Pool career
Aside from snooker, Shi has had a successful pool career. In 2016, he was the winner of the WPA World Chinese Eight-ball Championship, defeating Mick Hill by a scoreline of 21–20.

Performance and rankings timeline

Notes

Pool titles
 2016 CBSA World Chinese Eight-ball Championship

References

External links
Profile on Snooker.org

1990 births
Living people
Chinese snooker players
21st-century Chinese people